Hippobromus is a genus of flowering plants belonging to the family Sapindaceae.

Its native range is Southern Africa.

Species:
 Hippobromus pauciflorus (L.f.) Radlk.

References

Sapindaceae
Monotypic Sapindaceae genera